Jerry Troy "J. T." Corenflos (November 6, 1963 – October 24, 2020), was an American session musician and country guitarist, who played on an estimated 75 Number One hit records as well as hundreds of other recordings and hits.  He received 14 nominations for "Guitarist of the Year" from the Academy of Country Music (2002-2012, 2014–2015, and 2020), winning in 2012 and 2020.

Early Years 
Jerry Troy Corenflos was born on November 6, 1963, in Terre Haute, Indiana to parents Jerry and Alice Corenflos. His dad (Big Jerry) was a carpenter, who worked at Overhead Door company and, later, at Indiana State University. Although a gifted and hardworking carpenter, Big Jerry's real passion was music, a passion he shared and nurtured in the young Jerry Troy. JT's mom, Alice, worked at the Columbia Records pressing plant and the 8-track plant in Terre Haute. Alice later ran the small restaurant, the Shuffle Inn Restaurant and worked at (Larry Birds') Boston Connection restaurant. JT has a son, Jacob Corenflos, who is also a musician, and two siblings, brother Steve Corenflos and sister Cathy.

Growing up in the Highlands neighborhood of Terre Haute, JT's childhood was filled with playing sports, riding bikes and hanging out with neighborhood friends, all of whom would remain friends throughout his life. He attended Rankin elementary school, Terre Town elementary school, Otter Creek junior high school, North Vigo high school. It was during these early years, that JT began playing guitar under the tutelage of his dad. JT's quiet passion and determination to master the guitar, drove his rapid development, and by junior high he had already outgrown most guitar instructors in the area. During these years, JT played with his dad's bands in a wide variety of venues and circumstances. As JT himself wrote on his website: "I played just about every venue possible: Moose Lodge, VFW, American Legion, beer joint, nightclub, motel lounge, ice cream social, wedding reception, super market parking lot, frat party, high school dance, street festival, biker bar, birthday party, nudist colony (no kidding) small town opry, bean dinner, community center and backyard bbq within a hundred miles. Not to mention all the basements, and garages starting out. BIG TIME STUFF!"

Career
In March 1982, at the urging of fellow Terre Haute musician and early mentor, Marc Rogers, JT moved to Nashville to play guitar for Jean Shepard (Capital\United Artist Records, Grand ole Opry). He worked with Jean for about a year and a half performing mostly at the Grand ole Opry and occasionally some road dates. In early summer of 1983, JT auditioned and landed a job with Joe Stampley (Epic\CBS records), and worked with him for seven years doing road dates. Occasionally, Joe would collaborate with fellow singer Moe Bandy as "Moe and Joe", doing some television shows and recording as a duo. When not on the road, JT played in clubs around Nashville with several different writer/artists, sometimes helping them work on their demos in the studio. One of those bands was called "The Fantastic" Blue Tick Hounds featuring David Lee Murphy. The Blue Tick Hounds played all over Nashville through the mid and late 80s, and JT continued working with David Lee Murphy throughout his life. .

In the spring of 1990, JT left the road to stay in Nashville and focus on doing studio work. Likening it to "starting over again", he played every Jam night, Writer night, showcase club, casual gig, beer joint and dive bar he could find, not to mention trying to get studio work. During this period of taking whatever studio work he could get his hands on, JT met a lot of other really great players, aspiring songwriters, artists and producers, many of whom he continued to work with throughout his life.

By 1992, JT was starting to get a good bit of demo session work, while helping form a band called Palomino Road (Capitol\Liberty Records). Palomino Road did one album and about a year and a half of road dates. After Palomino Road disbanded, JT decided to focus 100% on session work.

Somewhere Under The Radar
In 2015, Corenflos released a solo album titled Somewhere Under The Radar, composed of 12 instrumental songs showcasing his electric guitar playing.

Gear
Corenflos was known for playing a blue Telecaster style guitar with a 1984 contoured alder Joe Glaser body and the V-shaped neck from a late 1956 Fender Esquire.

Death 
On the evening of October 24, 2020, multiple members of Nashville's studio community began posting tributes to Corenflos, including Derek Wells, a long-time friend of his, who confirmed that Corenflos had died earlier that day. Less than a week before his death, it had been announced that Corenflos was battling pneumonia.

References

American country guitarists
American male guitarists
American session musicians
1963 births
2020 deaths
People from Terre Haute, Indiana
Country musicians from Indiana
20th-century guitarists
20th-century American musicians
21st-century American guitarists
21st-century American musicians
Guitarists from Indiana
20th-century American male musicians
21st-century American male musicians